Albert Gallatin Marchand (February 27, 1811 – February 5, 1848) was a Democratic member of the U.S. House of Representatives from Pennsylvania.

Albert G. Marchand (son of David Marchand) was born near Greensburg, Pennsylvania.  He studied law, was admitted to the bar in 1833 and commenced practice in Greensburg.

Marchand was elected as a Democrat to the Twenty-sixth and Twenty-seventh Congresses.  He served as chairman of the United States House Committee on Accounts during the Twenty-seventh Congress.  He declined to be a candidate for renomination in 1842 to the Twenty-eighth Congress.  He resumed the practice of law and died in Greensburg in 1848.  Interment in Greensburg Cemetery.

Sources

The Political Graveyard

1811 births
1848 deaths
Pennsylvania lawyers
Democratic Party members of the United States House of Representatives from Pennsylvania
19th-century American politicians
19th-century American lawyers